Carro is a Spanish surname. People with this name include:

Fernando Carro (born 1992), Spanish middle-distance runner
John Carro (born 1927), US lawyer and judge
Leandro Carro (1890–1967), Spanish communist leader 
Luciana Carro (born 1981), Canadian actress 
Marta Carro (born 1991), Spanish footballer
Osvaldo Carro (born 1973), Uruguayan football
Jean de Carro (1770–1857), Swiss-born physician

See also

Carlo (name)
Carry (name)